The success of the TV series, Buffy the Vampire Slayer and Angel have led to a number of published guidebooks both official and unofficial. Such books are used as sources of information, and opinions on the two TV series.

Official guidebooks

"Watcher's Guides"

The Official guides to Buffy the Vampire Slayer offer a comprehensive guide to the show. The episode guides include synopses, lines from the shooting scripts that were deleted, biographies, interviews, music listings, monster listings, special notes, pictures, quotes, and much behind-the-scenes information.

Watcher's Guide Volume III opted to include only an episode guide (Seasons 5–7), and a number of essays:

"Casefiles"

 

The official companions to Angel. The content of these books follows similar standards set by the "Watcher's Guides", including comprehensive episodes guides, images, quotes and behind the scenes information.

Volume I covers Angel Seasons 1 & 2.

Volume II covers Angel Seasons 3 & 4.

Unofficial guidebooks

These books were not licensed by 20th Century Fox as official Buffy/Angel merchandise.

Keith Topping

Keith Topping has written several unofficial guide books to television series such as The X Files, The Avengers, The Sweeney and The Professionals. He has also written guides to both Buffy (Slayer), and Angel (Hollywood Vampire).

The style of the guides analytically studies each episode in categories, drawing attention to things which may otherwise have not been noticed by viewers.

Slayer

The first edition of Slayer was released in the UK in December 1999, and offered a guide to the first three seasons of Buffy. The book has undergone numerous editions, the most recent of which, Complete Slayer includes information on all seven seasons of Buffy.

The categories which Topping uses to analyse each episode include:

Hollywood Vampire

Hollywood Vampire has gone through several editions, the most comprehensive of which (February 2004), includes Angel seasons 1–4. The 228-page guide to Angel Season 5, Hollywood Vampire: The Apocalypse, also by Topping, was released in May 2005.

The layout of the guide follows that of Slayer using categories for each episode, some of which are different than its predecessor:

Nikki Stafford

Nikki Stafford has written guides on both Buffy (Bite Me) and Angel (Once Bitte).

Bite Me

The most recent edition (September 2002) includes Seasons 1-6. It also gives capsule reviews to Angel (Seasons 1-3). Additionally it includes behind scenes information, and a biography of Sarah Michelle Gellar.

Once Bitten

A guide to Angel seasons 1-5. Features a history of the show, a section profiling the best websites, a look at Buffy and Angel's recognition in academic circles, behind-the-scenes information.

Dusted

Lawrence Miles, who usually focuses on fiction, here offers his opinions on seven seasons of Buffy. The guide contains a comprehensive episode guide and a brief guide to the Buffy comics and novels that had been published prior to 2003.

The Girl's Got Bite

The second edition (May 2003) of this book covers up to mid-way through the seventh season of Buffy (and therefore is not a guide to the entirety of the series) and features episode guides, cast biographies, Buffy trivia and behind-the-scenes anecdotes.

Footnotes

External links

Official guides
Nika-summers.com - Review of Watcher's Guides I
Revolutionsf.com - Review of Watcher's Guides I
Nika-summers.com - Review of Watcher's Guides II
The11thhour.com - Review of Watcher's Guides II

Unofficial guides
Nika-summers.com - Review of The Girl's Got Bite (2003 edition)
Nika-summers.com - Review of Monster Book
Cityofangel.com - Article about Nikki Stanford and her book, Once Bitten

Books about the Buffyverse